Virgie is an unincorporated community in Union Township, Jasper County, Indiana.

History
Virgie contained a post office from 1890 until 1913. The community was named for Virgie Warner, a daughter of a local resident.

Geography

References

Unincorporated communities in Jasper County, Indiana
Unincorporated communities in Indiana